Maiken Mikkelsen is a physicist who won the Maria Goeppert Mayer award from the American Physical Society in 2017 for her work in quantum nanophotonics.  She is currently the James N. and Elizabeth H. Barton Associate Professor of Electrical and Computer Engineering  and an Associate Professor of Physics at Duke University.

Education 
Maiken Mikkelsen received her B.S. in Physics in 2004 from the University of Copenhagen. She received her Ph.D. in Physics in 2009 from the University of California, Santa Barbara, where she studied single electron spin dynamics in semiconductors for her Ph.D. thesis and for which she won the 2011 Thesis Prize from the Quantum Electronics and Optical Division (QEOD) of the European Physical Society. She did a postdoctoral research fellowship at the University of California at Berkeley before joining the faculty at Duke University in 2012.

Publications
Her most cited publications are:
 (cited  550 times according to Google Scholar
 (cited  277 times according to Google Scholar)   
 (cited  211 times according to Google Scholar) 
 (cited  210 times according to Google Scholar) 
 (cited  185 times according to Google Scholar)

References

External links 
 Faculty profile
 Mikkelsen Lab site

Women physicists
Duke University faculty
University of Copenhagen alumni
University of California, Santa Barbara alumni
Year of birth missing (living people)
Living people